Harrowgate is an area, or township, of north Darlington in the borough of Darlington, County Durham, England. The area includes the villages of Beaumont Hill, the Harrowgate Village as well as Ashbrook and Harrowgate Hill with the latter the largest part of the area.

The area is covered by the Harrowgate Hill Ward, the villages are in the Whessoe civil parish (the name is notable for its use as a name for the Whessoe company) and the rest is unparished. Before the ward boundary changes in 2015 was enclosed on two sides by railways — the East Coast Main Line to the east, and the Tees Valley Line to the west. The Ashbrook area, which lies to the east of the main line now also forms part of the ward. The ward extends as far south as Thompson Street and as far north as Beaumont Hill. The old ward population was 5,997 at the 2011 census and needed expanding to meet around 7,000.

References

External links 
 Harrowgate Hill website

Suburbs of Darlington
Places in the Tees Valley